Truthdare Doubledare is the second album (released in 1986 on MCA Records) by the British dance band Bronski Beat. It is their first album to feature John Foster as lead vocalist, following the departure of Jimmy Somerville who went on to form The Communards. The album was released on CD in 1998.

Track listing
 "Hit That Perfect Beat" - 3:38
 "Truthdare Doubledare" - 4:43
 "C'mon! C'mon!" - 3:50
 "Punishment for Love" - 4:14
 "We Know How It Feels" - 4:13
 "This Heart" - 4:19
 "Do It" - 3:50
 "Dr. John" - 4:41
 "In My Dreams" - 4: 17
 "What Are You Going to Do About It" - 6:15
 "C'mon C'mon" (12" version) - 6:15
 "Hit That Perfect Beat" (12" version) - 6:21
 "I Gave You Everything" - 4:00

Personnel
Bronski Beat
Steve Bronski - 6- and 12-string guitars, double-speed guitar, accordion, synthesizers, keyboards, programming
Larry Steinbachek - drums, percussion, drum programming, keyboards, marimba
John Foster - vocals

Singles
"Hit That Perfect Beat"
"C'mon! C'mon!"

Charts

Weekly charts

References

1986 albums
Bronski Beat albums
London Records albums